Peace River is a provincial electoral district in Alberta, Canada. The district is mandated to return a single member to the Legislative Assembly of Alberta using the first past the post method of voting. The district used instant-runoff voting from 1926 to 1957.

It is one of two Alberta districts in operation since the birth of the province (alongside St. Albert). Peace River is a reliable bellwether district, held by governing political parties for most of its history — former MLA Debbie Jabbour is no exception, as she was elected for the first time in 2015 when the Alberta NDP came to power for the first time. Peace River last elected an opposition MLA in 1940.

Geography

Peace River encompasses a largely rural area in the northwest corner of Alberta. Urban municipalities within the riding include the towns of Grimshaw, High Level, Manning, Peace River, and Rainbow Lake, as well as the village of Nampa. The riding also includes the entirety of two rural municipalities (Mackenzie County and the County of Northern Lights) and portions of three others (Improvement District No. 24, the Municipal District of Peace No. 135, and Northern Sunrise County).

Four First Nations are located within the riding's boundaries: Beaver First Nation, Dene Tha' First Nation, Little Red River Cree Nation, and Tallcree First Nation.

Peace River borders the ridings of Central Peace-Notley to the southwest, Lesser Slave Lake to the southeast, and Fort McMurray-Wood Buffalo to the east. The riding also borders British Columbia to the west and the Northwest Territories to the north.

History
Peace River was established when the province was created in 1905, covering the western section of what had been the District of Athabasca, which had never been represented in the North West Assembly. The district boundaries have been revised many times over the last century, but have always contained the town of Peace River and the northwestern section of the province.

The 2010 boundary redistribution saw the district gain a portion of land that belongs to the Municipal District of Northern Lights that was in the old Dunvegan-Central Peace district. In the 2017 redistribution, it gained Grimshaw from Dunvegan-Central Peace-Notley.

Boundary history

Representation history

The electoral district was created in 1905 when the province was founded. The first election held that year was a two-way race between Liberal candidate James Cornwall and Independent candidate Lucien Dubuc. Both were supporters of the Rutherford government.

The election results took weeks to come back. The results of the election were never released to the public; they were overturned by the cabinet due to significant irregularities and the riding was declared vacant. Dubuc who had won decided not to run again, but instead challenged the calling of a new election in court.

Dubuc failed in court and a new election was held on February 15, 1906. Thomas Brick, an Independent Liberal who was encouraged to run by local farmers, won with a landslide over Cornwall. Brick only held the district for a single term. He was initially going to run for a second term but dropped out during the campaign in 1909. Cornwall would being the only candidate in the race was acclaimed.

Cornwall only held the district for a single term. Near the end of the 3rd Legislative Assembly, Cornwall announced his retirement saying he was through with politics. He had been the subject of investigation in the Alberta and Great Waterways Railway scandal that rocked the Rutherford government.

The lands in the Peace River district experienced a great influx of settlers during this period. The 1913 election would be hotly contested with Conservative Alphaeus Patterson defeating future MLA William Rae and former Athabasca MLA William Bredin.

Rae would pick up the district in 1917 after Patterson retired. He would hold the district until he was defeated in 1921 by United Farmers candidate Donald Kennedy. Kennedy resigned his seat very quickly so that Premier Herbert Greenfield could have a seat in the legislature. Greenfield only represented the district for a single term. His replacement was United Farmers candidate Hugh Allen.

Allen only served for a single term, retiring in 1930. The United Farmers chose William Bailey as his replacement. Bailey served from 1930 until he was defeated by Social Credit candidate William Lampley in the 1935 general election.

Lampley served until 1940 when he was defeated by Independent Eld Martin. Martin also served a single term before Social Credit candidate William Gilliland defeated him in the 1944 election.

Gilliland held the district for a number of terms. He was re-elected in 1948, 1952, 1955 and 1959. He died on October 26, 1961 leaving the seat vacant.

The by-election held that year was won by Social Credit candidate Euell Montgomery. He held the district for three terms, winning re-election in 1963 before retiring in 1967. The last Social Credit member to hold the riding was Robert Wiebe, elected in 1967.

The 1971 election saw Wiebe defeated by Progressive Conservative candidate Al Adair. Adair held the district for six terms, being re-elected in 1975, 1979, 1982, 1986 and again in 1989. The Progressive Conservative dominance over Peace River continued as candidate Gary Friedel won the district in 1993. He lasted two more terms winning in 1997 and 2001 before retiring in 2004.

In 2004, Progressive Conservative Frank Oberle was elected to represent Peace River. He was re-elected to a second term in 2008, and served as the province's Energy Minister.

In 2015, a close race saw NDP MLA Debbie Jabbour defeat Oberle by a mere 282 votes. Jabbour was subsequently also elected as Deputy Speaker of the province, and is the current representative for Peace River.

Legislature results

Elections in the 1900s

The first election held in 1905 in the Peace River electoral district took place on November 9, 1905 with the rest of the province.

The race was contested by James Cornwall who was a fur trader and businessman well known in northern Canada. He established trading posts all over north county. Cornwall's candidacy was officially endorsed by the provincial Liberals.

The other candidate in the race was Independent Lucien Dubuc. He was a lawyer and later became a judge and was a legal pioneer in Alberta's history. Dubuc despite being independent supported the government of Premier Alexander Rutherford.

Pundits had expected Cornwall to win the district easily. The returns came back 56 days after polls had closed as returning officer George Mcleod had to travel 1,100 miles to pick up the ballot boxes before returning to Edmonton.

Dubuc was elected but the cabinet refused to recognize the results on the grounds that a proper election was never really held and returns were incomplete as polling stations were missed. A new election was called for February 15, 1906 instead. Dubuc challenged the calling of a new election in court. The case was lost when the judge ruled that the courts have no jurisdiction in dealing with matters regarding elections and that responsibility is the purview of the legislature.

The provincial cabinet which overturned the 1905 election results due to significant irregularities issued a new writ for February 15, 1906.

The candidates in the race were James Cornwall, who was the official Liberal candidate. He decided to run for office a second time. The second candidate in the race was Peace River resident, fur trader Thomas Allen Brick who was a supporter of the Rutherford government and ran as an Independent Liberal.

Brick was nominated by a large group of residents living in the town of Peace River. asked resident and farmer Brick to run for office and represent them in Edmonton The returns were announced by returning officer George McLeod on March 5, 1906. Brick won easily, taking almost 80% of the 158 votes cast to defeat Cornwall in a landslide.

The results were certified on April 24, 1906 by the Clerk of the Executive Council in Edmonton two months after the start of the opening session of the 1st Alberta Legislative Assembly thus completing the 1905 general election.

|colspan=3|Liberal gain from Independent Liberal

The 1909 general election in the Peace River district was scheduled to take place on July 7, 1909.
The only other riding in the province that had not yet voted was the Athabasca electoral district which was scheduled to vote on July 15, 1909. This was almost five months after the rest of the province had voted.

The two candidates initially in the race were incumbent Independent Liberal Thomas Brick and Liberal James Cornwall, who had run in the district twice before. Brick decided however to drop out of the race before the nomination deadline. Cornwall was the only candidate left in the race. He was acclaimed to office on June 30, 1909.

Elections in the 1910s

|colspan=3|Conservative gain from Liberal

The 1913 election in the Peace River electoral district took place on September 23, 1913. It was the last district to vote in the general election.

There were three candidates chosen to run in the district. This was the first election in which the provincial Conservatives nominated a candidate; they chose Alphaeus Patterson to run under their banner.

The provincial Liberals chose William Archibald Rae, a pioneer barrister in the district, to run under their banner. Former Member of the Legislative Assembly William Bredin decided to also run as an Independent Liberal. All three candidates were residents of the town of Grande Prairie.

The election results showed a tight race between Patterson and Rae. Patterson won less than half of the popular vote while Bredin helped split the Liberal vote enough to allow Patterson to win.

Turnout and interest in the election were substantially up, as a wave of settlement had happened in the constituency in recent years.

|}

Elections in the 1920s

|}

|colspan=3|United Farmers hold

|}
A series of by-elections were needed after the United Farmers government took power in 1921. The United Farmers caucus chose Herbert Greenfield as the new Premier. Unfortunately he lacked a seat in the legislature.

Incumbent United Farmers MLA Donald MacBeth Kennedy resigned his district after only holding it for a few months to pursue a seat in the 1921 Canadian federal election. The only other seat available was Ponoka which had been made vacant by the death of United Farmers MLA Percival Baker. Of the two choices Greenfield chose to run in Peace River.

Along with this by-election and Ponoka five other ministerial by-elections to confirm cabinet ministers were called for an election day of December 9, 1921. This was set for one week after the 1921 Canadian federal election. The by-election writ was dropped on November 16, 1921.

Greenfield ran unopposed and was acclaimed at the nomination deadline held on December 2, 1921. The timing of the by-elections was deliberately chosen to coincide with the federal election to ensure that opposition candidates would be unlikely to oppose the cabinet ministers.

|}

Elections in the 1930s

|}

|-
!colspan=6|Final count

|colspan=2|Exhausted ballots
|align=right|588

|}

Elections in the 1940s

|}
Stunned by the Social Credit victory in 1935, the Liberals and Conservatives jointly endorsed candidates across Alberta in what was known as the Independent Citizen's Association. This was the last time an opposition MLA was elected in Peace River.

|}

|}

Elections in the 1950s

|}

|}

|}

Elections in the 1960s

|}

|}

|}

Elections in the 1970s

|}

|}

|}

Elections in the 1980s

|}

|}

|}

Elections in the 1990s

|}

|}

Elections in the 2000s

|}

|}

|}

Elections in the 2010s

Senate nominee results

2004 Senate nominee election district results
Voters had the option of selecting 4 candidates on the ballot.

2012 Senate nominee election district results

Plebiscite results

1948 electrification plebiscite
District results from the first province wide plebiscite on electricity regulation:

1957 liquor plebiscite

On October 30, 1957 a stand-alone plebiscite was held province wide in all 50 of the then current provincial electoral districts in Alberta. The government decided to consult Alberta voters to decide on liquor sales and mixed drinking after a divisive debate in the legislature. The plebiscite was intended to deal with the growing demand for reforming antiquated liquor control laws.

The plebiscite was conducted in two parts. Question A, asked in all districts, asked the voters if the sale of liquor should be expanded in Alberta, while Question B, asked in a handful of districts within the corporate limits of Calgary and Edmonton, asked if men and women should be allowed to drink together in establishments.

Province wide Question A of the plebiscite passed in 33 of the 50 districts while Question B passed in all five districts. Peace River overwhelmingly voted in favour of the proposal by a wide margin. Voter turnout in the district was extremely low, almost half the province wide average of 46%. This decline in turnout was attributed to heavy rains, high winds and flooding conditions in the district that kept people away from polling stations.

Official district returns were released to the public on December 31, 1957. The Social Credit government in power at the time did not consider the results binding. However the results of the vote led the government to repeal all existing liquor legislation and introduce an entirely new Liquor Act.

Municipal districts lying inside electoral districts that voted against the plebiscite were designated Local Option Zones by the Alberta Liquor Control Board and considered effective dry zones. Business owners who wanted a license had to petition for a binding municipal plebiscite in order to be granted a license.

Student vote results

2004 election

On November 19, 2004 a student vote was conducted at participating Alberta schools to parallel the 2004 Alberta general election results. The vote was designed to educate students and simulate the electoral process for persons who have not yet reached the legal majority. The vote was conducted in 80 of the 83 provincial electoral districts with students voting for actual election candidates. Schools with a large student body that reside in another electoral district had the option to vote for candidates outside of the electoral district than where they were physically located.

References

External links 
Electoral Divisions Act 2003
Demographics for Peace River
Riding Map of Peace River
Website of the Legislative Assembly of Alberta
Student Vote Alberta 2004

Alberta provincial electoral districts
Peace River Country